David Scott Dibble (born August 27, 1965) is an American politician serving as a member of the Minnesota Senate. A member of the Minnesota Democratic–Farmer–Labor Party (DFL), he represents District 61, which includes portions of Minneapolis in Hennepin County.

Education
Dibble attended both the University of Minnesota and the University of St. Thomas in Saint Paul.

Early activism
Dibble first became involved in politics in the mid-1980s working on issues concerning the civil rights of gay, lesbian, bisexual, and transgender (LGBT) communities, including advocacy for those with HIV/AIDS. He was an activist and organizer for "It's Time, Minnesota," a statewide LGBT rights organization that helped pass the 1993 Minnesota Human Rights Act. This led to organizing on issues of social and economic justice—especially in the areas of neighborhood livability, transportation, housing, energy and the environment.

Dibble later worked as an aide to Minneapolis City Council Member Doré Mead for about six years. In 2000, he ran for a seat in the Minnesota House of Representatives, becoming the third openly gay person to serve in the Minnesota legislature.

Minnesota legislature
Dibble served one term in the Minnesota House, representing District 60B. He was elected to the Senate in 2002, and reelected in 2006, 2010, 2012, 2016, and 2020. Dibble played a pivotal role in overriding Governor Tim Pawlenty's veto of a transportation improvement bill that allowed the Twin Cities to build a modern transit system.

Issues

Same-sex marriage
After his leadership in the campaign against the constitutional amendment to ban same-sex marriage in Minnesota, Dibble, Representative Karen Clark, and several other legislators proposed an amendment during the 2013 legislative session to legalize same-sex marriage. The bill passed and same-sex marriage became legal on August 1, 2013.

The environment
Dibble has served as chief author or as a lead negotiator on energy efficiency standards, implementing a renewable energy standard, establishing a carbon dioxide reduction mandate, instituting the nation's most stringent mercury emission reduction requirements for coal-fired energy, the first legislation in the country on hybrid plug in electric cars, and programs to aid the construction of green buildings and assist local governments in building more energy-efficient facilities. He helped author and served on the Green Jobs Task Force charged with developing a comprehensive economic development policy to shape Minnesota's participation in the green economy for generations to come.

Medical cannabis
In 2014, Dibble was the chief author of a bill that allowed limited use of medical cannabis for patients who have debilitating or terminal illnesses. He has also worked to legalize cannabis for recreational use.

Transportation
Dibble continues to be the DFL leader in the Minnesota Senate on legislation relating to transportation and transit, energy efficiency, the environment, housing and economic development.

Personal life
Dibble is openly gay. His husband is Richard Leyva. They married in California before the passage of Proposition 8. In November 2019, Dibble announced that a man whom Dibble had had an extramarital relationship with had allegedly attempted to blackmail him through revenge porn.

Dibble is a runner and has completed several marathons.

References

External links

Senator Scott Dibble official Minnesota Senate website
Minnesota Public Radio Vote Tracker: Sen. D. Scott Dibble Profile
Senator Scott Dibble official campaign website
Instagram

Living people
1965 births
Gay politicians
LGBT state legislators in Minnesota
People from Hennepin County, Minnesota
Politicians from Minneapolis
Democratic Party members of the Minnesota House of Representatives
Democratic Party Minnesota state senators
University of Minnesota alumni
21st-century American politicians